The Archaeological Museum of Kozani is a museum in Kozani, Greece.

The museum's collection includes finds from archaeological excavations as well as from individuals from all over Kozani prefecture, apart from the Aiani area. It includes sculptures, inscriptions, statues, reliefs, clay vessels, figurines, and gold, silver, and bronze jewellery, all dating from the Palaeolithic to the Roman period.

External links
Museums of Macedonia
Hellenic Ministry of Culture and Tourism
Municipality of Kozani (in Greek) 2009-12-09 - The building of the museum is currently being restored and is closed to the public

Kozani
Museums in Kozani